Bakerton (Elmora PO)   is an unincorporated community in the township of West Carroll, Cambria County, Pennsylvania, United States. Bakerton, is the official town name, but it has an address of Elmora  with ZIP code 15737.

References

Unincorporated communities in Cambria County, Pennsylvania
Unincorporated communities in Pennsylvania